Hugo Palenque (born 1 December 1937) is a Bolivian footballer. He played in three matches for the Bolivia national football team from 1963 to 1967. He was also part of Bolivia's squad that won the 1963 South American Championship.

References

1937 births
Living people
Bolivian footballers
Bolivia international footballers
Place of birth missing (living people)
Association football defenders